Senji Panambakkam Railway Station is one of the railway stations of the Chennai Central–Arakkonam section of the Chennai Suburban Railway Network. The name represents the village duo: Senji & Panambakkam. It serves the villages of Senji, Panambakkam and Perambakkam, suburbs of Chennai, and is located 51 km west of Chennai Central railway station. It has an elevation of 54 m above sea level.

History
The lines at the station were electrified on 28 August 1982, with the electrification of the Tiruvallur–Arakkonam section.

See also

 Chennai Suburban Railway

References

External links
 Senji Panambakkam station at Indiarailinfo.com

 

Stations of Chennai Suburban Railway
Railway stations in Tiruvallur district